Brashears may refer to:

Brashears, Arkansas, an unincorporated community in Madison County, Arkansas, United States
James R. Brashears (1858–1917), American lawyer, politician and judge

See also
Brashear (disambiguation)